Filipa Cavalleri (born 6 December 1973) is a Portuguese judoka. She competed at the 1992, 1996 and the 2000 Summer Olympics.

References

1973 births
Living people
Portuguese female judoka
Olympic judoka of Portugal
Judoka at the 1992 Summer Olympics
Judoka at the 1996 Summer Olympics
Judoka at the 2000 Summer Olympics
Portuguese people of Italian descent
Sportspeople from Lisbon
20th-century Portuguese women
21st-century Portuguese women